Peter John Jaban is a DJ on Radio Free Sarawak and a human rights campaigner for Sarawak, Malaysia.

Early career
He worked in the Land and Survey Office in Sarawak's capital Kuching but resigned in 2006. He then worked as a DJ in Cats FM. He was also a former deputy chairman of the Sarawak Dayak Iban Association (SADIA). Peter stood as an independent candidate against the deputy chief minister of Sarawak, Alfred Jabu Numpang in 2006 Sarawak state election, but was lost decisively to the latter.

Activism

Radio Free Sarawak

Peter first met Clare Rewcastle Brown in 2008. In November 2010, Peter was invited by Clare to join Radio Free Sarawak, a radio that campaign against deforestation and loss of native land rights, and the alleged corruption of Sarawak's chief minister Abdul Taib Mahmud. Peter also started to use his on-air pseudonym "Papa Orang Utan".

Peter was detained immediately upon his arrival at Kota Kinabalu International Airport on 31 May 2012 after a few weeks of vacation. He said that he had been "arrested and then photographed, his documents copied, before being escorted on to the airplane" and flown to Miri, Sarawak. Peter was later taken away by three unidentified men shortly after arriving in Sarawak although he was escorted by Miri PKR chairman, Dr Micheal Teo. However, Sarawak police has denied any involvement in the arrest of Peter. This incident has sparked a public outrage because Peter just disappear without anyone knowing his location.

After 2 days, Peter was spotted and reportedly moving about freely in Miri. On the 3rd day, he contacted his colleague of Radio Free Sarawak. He apologised and clarify that the three men were good Samaritans and he decided to follow them because he feared for his safety. He did not have time to inform Micheal Teo of his intention because Teo was busy talking on the phone at that time. Peter's phone was not working because of heavy rain and thus he was unable to report his safety to his colleague in the first few days. After the incident, Peter decided to remain in Sarawak.

Sarawak self-determination
In 2013, Peter was researching on the history of Sarawak, especially the Sarawak Independence Day. In July 2014, he became a speaker on a public forum held by Sarawak Association for Peoples’ Aspiration (SAPA) on 1963 Malaysian agreement.

Peter was the SAPA publicity and information chief in 2020.

Peter founded the "Sarawakians for Sarawak" movement in 2021.

Filmography

Film

References

External links
 The official website of Radio Free Sarawak
 The fight for Sarawak on the Australian Broadcasting Corporation

Malaysian radio personalities
Living people
People from Kuching
Year of birth missing (living people)